Apnagyugh is a village in the Aparan Municipality of the Aragatsotn Province of Armenia.

References

Populated places in Aragatsotn Province